How We Got into Trouble with the Army  is a 1965 Italian comedy film directed by Lucio Fulci starring Franco and Ciccio. The title could also be translated as How We Got the Army in Trouble. This film was also known as I Due Marmittoni (The Two Rookies).

Plot 
Nick Moroni (Remo Germani), a young singer called up, learns that his wife Catherine (Alicia Brandet) is about to leave for America, taking with her their son. So he abducts the baby and takes him to the police station, asking a soldier named Piscitello (Franco Franchi) to keep him well hidden. Sgt. Camilloni (Ciccio Ingrassia) discovers the child and is led to believe he is the father, and asks Piscitello to keep the boy well hidden. Piscitello naturally takes advantage of the situation to blackmail the sergeant, demanding concessions to no end and subjecting him to endless harassment.

Cast

External links 
 

Films directed by Lucio Fulci
1965 films
1960s Italian-language films
1960s buddy comedy films
Military humor in film
Italian buddy comedy films
1965 comedy films
1960s Italian films